Shenton, as a surname, is the 5583rd most common surname in Great Britain with 1,624 bearers. It is most common in South Gloucestershire, where it is the 7th most common surname with 1,805 bearers.

Meaning
The name dates back to the Anglo-Saxon tribes of Britain, where Scyne, Scoéne meaning fair and beautiful used a personal name plus tún meaning tún, estate, farm etc.

Notable people 
 Ben Shenton (born 1960), Jersey politician
 Brian Shenton (1927–1987), British sprinter
 Edward Shenton (1895–1977), American illustrator and author
 Ernest Shenton (1930–2008), businessman
 George Shenton, Sr. (1811–1867), Australian pharmacist and merchant
 George Shenton (1842–1909), Australian businessman and mayor
 George Shenton (footballer) (1899–1978), English footballer
 Henry Chawner Shenton (1803–1866), English engraver
 Herbert N. Shenton (died 1937), sociologist
 Michael Shenton (born 1986), English rugby player
 Ollie Shenton (born 1997), English footballer
 Rachel Shenton (born 1987), English actress, screenwriter, and activist
 Richard Shenton (1926–2013), Jersey politician
 Richard Shenton (cricketer) (born 1972), English cricketer
 Shenton Thomas (1879–1962), colonial governor
 William Shenton (1885–1967), English solicitor who worked in Hong Kong

External links
 https://www.forebears.co.uk/surnames/shenton

See also
Shenton (disambiguation)

English toponymic surnames